The Israeli Military Intelligence (Agaf HaModi'in; lit. "the Intelligence Section"), often abbreviated to Aman, is the central, overarching military intelligence body of the Israel Defense Forces. Aman was created in 1950, when the Intelligence Department was spun off from the IDF's General Staff (the Intelligence Department itself was composed largely of former members of the Haganah Intelligence Service). Aman is an independent service, and not part of the ground forces, Navy or the Air Force. 

It is one of the main entities (and the largest component) of the Israeli Intelligence Community, along with Mossad and Shin Bet. It is currently headed by Major General Aharon Haliva. It includes the cyber warfare branch Unit 8200, the secret technology Unit 81, and the training course Havatzalot Program. Its special operations unit is General Staff Reconnaissance Unit (Sayeret Matkal).

Roles and jurisdiction

 

The IDF's Intelligence Corps, abbreviated as Haman and headed by a brigadier general, has been detached from Aman since the Yom Kippur War, but remains under its jurisdiction.

In April 2000, the newest IDF corps was founded (the IDF's fifth land corps), the Combat Intelligence Collection Corps, abbreviated as Modash. It was designed to fulfill some of Aman's former combat intelligence functions, and is also headed by a Brigadier General. Although it falls under the operational jurisdiction of the GOC Army Headquarters, it also falls under Aman's professional jurisdiction.

In 1976, according to the Lexicon of National Security, some of Aman's principal roles consisted of:

Intelligence evaluation for security policy, military planning and "fluid security policy," and the dissemination of intelligence to IDF and governmental bodies.
Field security at the level of the General Staff (today,), and the training and operation of field security in general (all levels).
The operation of military censorship.
Direction and operation of the 'Collection Agencies'.
Drawing maps; providing the direction and supervision for the dissemination of maps.
The development of 'special measures' for intelligence work.
The development of intelligence doctrine in the realms of research, collection, and field security.
Staff responsibility for military attachés overseas.

History
During the founding of the state of Israel, the Haganah military organization was primarily responsible for gathering intelligence, or one of its elite units, the Scherut Jediot (secret service), or Shai.

Prime Minister David Ben Gurion commissioned the Shai in the late 1940s to create a secret service structure for Israel. Shai member Re’uwen Schiloach established based on Shai four independent services: Aman and Schin Bet and also the foreign intelligence service Machleket Hacheker and the Institute for Illegal Immigration Mossad le-Alija Bet (defunct in March 1952). In addition, in mid-1949 Shiloah created the Committee of Secret Service chiefs as a super-ordinate body. From 1963 the international secret service was officially called "Institute for Intelligence Service and Special Tasks" (ha-Mosad le-Modi'in u-le-Tafkidim Mejuhadim), short Mossad.

An offshoot of the Department of Defense was also the lesser-known Lakam technology intelligence agency. The existence of which was long considered a state secret. It was used to obtain scientific and technological information. In the 1980s, however, the Lakam lost much of its previous importance.

One of the biggest defeats of the Israeli secret services was caused by the Aman in the 1950s. Defense Minister Pinhas Lavon had to resign as part of the so-called Lavon affair. Aman-led "Operation Susannah" was intended to attack western facilities in Egypt by Israeli agents and saboteurs. The aim was to disrupt the good ties between the United States and the Egyptian head of state, Gamal Abdel Nasser. The US should believe that the Egyptian state is powerless against religious organizations. Egypt managed uncover the agent circle. Ten members were sentenced in a show trial in January 1955, two of them to death. Lavon resigned a month later, then Benjamin Gibli, then Aman's director, two weeks later. Ultimately, Head of State Ben Gurion resigned in 1963 after being worn down by ongoing discussions.

Units
Aman consists of the following subordinate and professionally subordinate units:

Staff units
Intelligence Corps

Collection units
Camp 1391
Unit 8200

Research
Research Department

Information security
Information Security Department
Military Censor [Part of Aman, but an entirely independent unit, not subordinate to any military or political level, only to parliamentary and judicial oversight]

Special Operations Division
Unit 81
General Staff Reconnaissance Unit
Intelligence center

Other units
Supervision Department
External Relations Department
Ro'im Rachok
Havatzalot Program

Professionally subordinate units
Air Intelligence Group: the intelligence unit of the Israeli Air Force
Naval Intelligence Division: the intelligence unit of the Israeli Navy
Combat Intelligence Collection Corps: the intelligence unit of GOC Army Headquarters
The intelligence units of the Regional Commands: Central, Northern, Southern and Home Front Commands
Center for Consciousness Operations: a psychological warfare unit of the Operations Directorate

List of directors
The head of Aman is the senior intelligence officer in the IDF and engages in intelligence decision and policy-making at the same level as the heads of the Shabak and the Mossad: together, they form the three highest-ranking, co-equal heads of the Israeli Intelligence Community, focusing on the military, domestic (including the Palestinian territories), and foreign intelligence fronts respectively.

On June 10, 2005, then-IDF's Chief of Staff, Lieutenant General Dan Halutz, in a move viewed as surprising, announced that Major General Aharon Zeevi-Farkash would be replaced by Major General Amos Yadlin. Yadlin, who had been serving as the IDF's military attaché in Washington, D.C., was a combat pilot, former head of the air force's Air Intelligence Directorate, and Halutz's deputy. Yadlin was appointed as Aman Director on January 5, 2006, with Zeevi-Farkash having served an extended term. In November 2010 Yadlin was replaced by Major General Aviv Kochavi.

 1948–1949: Isser Be'eri
 1949–1950: Colonel Chaim Herzog
 1950–1955: Colonel Binyamin Gibli
 1955–1959: Major General Yehoshafat Harkabi
 1959–1962: Major General Chaim Herzog
 1962–1963: Major General Meir Amit
 1964–1972: Major General Aharon Yariv
 1972–1974: Major General Eli Zeira
 1974–1978: Major General Shlomo Gazit
 1979–1983: Major General Yehoshua Sagi
 1983–1985: Major General Ehud Barak
 1986–1991: Major General Amnon Lipkin-Shahak
 1991–1995: Major General Uri Sagi
 1995–1998: Major General Moshe Ya'alon
 1998–2001: Major General 
 2001–2006: Major General Aharon Zeevi-Farkash
 2006–2010: Major General Amos Yadlin
 2010–2014: Major General Aviv Kochavi
 2014–2018: Major General Herzi Halevi
 2018–2021: Major General 
 2021–present: Major General Aharon Haliva

See also
Israeli Security Forces
Israeli Intelligence Community

References

External links
GlobalSecurity.org on Aman (1996)
"Israeli Intelligence in the 1967 War," By Doron Geller, JUICE, The Jewish Agency for Israel, Education Dept.
"Israeli Intelligence and the Yom Kippur War of 1973," By Doron Geller, JUICE, The Jewish Agency for Israel, Education Dept.
The "Yom Kippur War: the IDF version," by Amir Oren, for Haaretz
"Intelligence service under scrutiny," by Dan Baron, for the Jewish Telegraphic Agency

 
Israeli intelligence agencies
Military intelligence agencies
Israel Defense Forces directorates
Military units and formations of Israel
Military units and formations established in 1950